As of April 2009, Air Ivoire operated scheduled passenger flights to the following destinations:

Destinations

Africa
 Benin
 Cotonou – Cadjehoun Airport
 Burkina Faso
 Ouagadougou – Ouagadougou Airport
 Cameroon
 Douala – Douala International Airport
 Yaoundé – Yaoundé Nsimalen International Airport
 Republic of the Congo
 Brazzaville – Maya-Maya Airport
 Côte d'Ivoire
 Abidjan – Port Bouet Airport
 Gabon
 Libreville – Libreville International Airport
 Ghana
 Accra – Kotoka International Airport
 Guinea
 Conakry – Conakry International Airport
 Mali
 Bamako – Senou International Airport
 Nigeria
Lagos - Murtala Mohammed International Airport
 Senegal
 Dakar/Yoff – Léopold Sédar Senghor International Airport
 Togo
 Lomé – Lomé-Tokoin Airport

Europe
 France
 Marseille – Marseille Provence Airport 
 Paris – Paris-Orly Airport

References

Lists of airline destinations